This is a list of the busiest airports in the United Kingdom, Channel Islands, and Isle of Man ranked by total passenger traffic, compiled from Civil Aviation Authority data from 2006 to 2021. For some years the figures also show total aircraft movements and cargo volume handled at each airport. For a complete list of UK airports, see List of airports in the United Kingdom and the British Crown Dependencies.

The United Kingdom, an island country, is home to many of Europe's largest and busiest airports. London Heathrow, which handles over 80 million international passengers annually, is the largest airport in the UK. London serves as the largest aviation hub in the world by passenger traffic, with six international airports, handling over 180 million passengers in 2019, more than any other city. London's second-busiest airport, London Gatwick, was until 2016 the world's busiest single-runway airport. Manchester Airport is the United Kingdom's fourth-busiest airport. London Stansted and London Luton are the third and fifth busiest airports, respectively.

The largest airport operator in the United Kingdom is Heathrow Airport Holdings (owner of Heathrow), followed by Manchester Airports Group (owner of Manchester, Stansted and East Midlands). Together with British Airways and Virgin Atlantic, they are part of the Aviation Foundation which lobby for the aviation needs of the United Kingdom.

Statistics

Overview

2020 / 2021 data 
The following is a list of the 40 largest UK airports by total passenger traffic in 2021, from UK CAA statistics.

Source: UK CAA Airport Data 2021

2019 / 2020 data 
The following is a list of the 40 largest UK airports by total passenger traffic in 2020, from UK CAA statistics.

Source: UK CAA Airport Data 2020

2018 / 2019 data 
The following is a list of the 40 largest UK airports by total passenger traffic in 2019, from UK CAA statistics.

Source: UK CAA Airport Data 2019

2017 / 2018 data 
The following is a list of the 40 largest UK airports by total passenger traffic in 2018, from UK CAA statistics.

Source: UK CAA Airport Data 2018

2016 / 2017 data 
The following is a list of the 40 largest UK airports by total passenger traffic in 2017, from UK CAA statistics.

Source: UK CAA Airport Data 2017

2015 / 2016 data 
The following is a list of the 40 largest UK airports by total passenger traffic and aircraft movements in 2016, from UK CAA statistics.

Source: UK CAA Airport Data 2016

2014 / 2015 data 
The following is a list of the 40 largest UK airports by total passenger traffic in 2015, from UK CAA statistics.

Source: UK CAA Airport Data 2015

2013 / 2014 data 
The following is a list of the 40 largest UK airports by total passenger traffic in 2014, from UK CAA statistics.

Source: UK CAA Airport Data 1990–2014

2012 / 2013 data 
The following is a list of the 40 largest UK airports by total passenger traffic in 2013, from UK CAA statistics.

Source: UK CAA Airport Data 1990–2014

2011 / 2012 data 
The following is a list of the 40 largest UK airports by total passenger traffic in 2012, from UK CAA statistics.

Source: UK CAA Airport Data 1990–2014

2010 / 2011 data 
The following is a list of the 40 largest UK airports by total passenger traffic in 2011, from UK CAA statistics.

Source: UK CAA Airport Data 1990–2014

2009 / 2010 data 
The following is a list of the 40 largest UK airports by total passenger traffic in 2010, from UK CAA statistics.

Source: UK CAA Airport Data 1990–2014

2008 / 2009 data 
The following is a list of the 40 largest UK airports by total passenger traffic in 2009, from UK CAA statistics.

Source: UK CAA Airport Data 1990–2014

20 largest UK airports by total passenger traffic

2010 data

Source: UK CAA Official Statistics

2009 data

Source: UK CAA Official Statistics

2008 data

Source: UK CAA Official Statistics

2007 data

Source: UK CAA Official Statistics

2006 data

Source: UK CAA Official Statistics

Future airport expansion 
 Heathrow Airport – Terminal 5 opened on 27 March 2008, increasing the total passenger numbers potentially to over 90 million, possibly making Heathrow the world's busiest airport. Plans for a third runway could increase aircraft movement dramatically and see over 115 million passengers using Heathrow annually; however, the decision could be made to give Gatwick a second runway. See also Future expansion and Expansion of London Heathrow Airport.
 Gatwick Airport – Battling with Heathrow for Government decision on an extra runway. A second runway at Gatwick could see it match or even overtake Heathrow's traffic and income. Supporters say multiple large London airports are better than one massive one.
 Manchester Airport – Expansion of services and facilities at Manchester Airport estimates a usage by 50 million passengers in 2030, which is more than twice as many as the airport handles now.
 Stansted Airport – Plans for a second runway to increase capacity were shelved in 2010. Sold by BAA to Manchester Airports group in 2013, following a Competition Commission ruling. See Stansted proposed expansion for more.
 Luton Airport – Luton's usage has increased by around 900% between 1991 and 2006; however, plans for another runway and new terminal were scrapped due to financial reasons, although plans for a new rail link between London St. Pancras and Luton Airport Parkway have been approved. See Development plans and the future
 Birmingham Airport – Birmingham Airport recently extended its runway to accommodate long haul flights to the Far East, South America and West Coast. The airport has drawn up plans for a second runway linked to High Speed 2. In July 2019 plans were confirmed by the airport for a £500 million pound expansion. This will enable the airport to accommodate for up to 20 million passengers. The new development will create over 3500 new jobs and is set to be complete in 2033. 
Leeds Bradford Airport – In November 2008, Bridgepoint Capital announced a £28 million expansion of the current terminal building at Leeds Bradford Airport, enabling the airport to handle in excess of 6 million passengers a year. The airport also intends to increase parking, the number of aircraft stands, and build a railway link towards Horsforth, enabling a link with Leeds railway station.
Bournemouth Airport – A£45 million redevelopment by Manchester Airports group was announced in 2006 and began in 2008. The terminal building is to double in size, to replace the arrivals terminal, increase the number of stands/gates from 4 to 13 and to add more car parking spaces.  Improvements to the local infrastructure, as well as the possibility of the construction of a new hotel are also included in the redevelopment phases.
 London Southend Airport – Since its purchase by the Stobart Group in 2008, London Southend Airport has embarked on a massive programme of development including a  runway extension, new terminal, railway station and hotel. EasyJet commenced services from the airport in April 2012 with the anticipation that 700,000 passengers would be carried by easyJet alone that year.
Bristol Airport – The expansion is to occur in stages, spread over 30 construction projects in order to increase passenger numbers to 10 million a year. Plans include a doubling of passenger terminal floorspace, new piers and aircraft parking stands, extensions to the apron, two multi-storey car parks and a public transport interchange. In October 2013, construction started on a £6.5 million walkway connected to the centre of the terminal, to provide four more pre-boarding zones. The  walkway opened in July 2014. It allows the use of jetways, including for wide-body aircraft such as the Boeing 787 Dreamliner. In August 2014, the airport announced that construction of an £8.6 million eastward extension of the terminal would start in September, and construction was completed in summer 2015. This expansion was immediately followed by the starting of an  western terminal extension that will expand the security, baggage handling and immigration facilities. A 201-room Hampton by Hilton hotel is under construction and is due to be complete by winter 2016. The airport has also invested in wider infrastructure such as the South Bristol Link road, which will speed up journey times to the airport.

See also 
Transport in the United Kingdom
Air transport in the United Kingdom
List of airports in the United Kingdom and the British Crown Dependencies

Notes

References

United Kingdom

Airports